Events from the year 1988 in North Korea.

Incumbents
Premier: Li Gun-mo (until 12 December), Yon Hyong-muk (starting 12 December)
Supreme Leader: Kim Il-sung

Events
North Korea at the 1988 Winter Olympics

Births

 5 April - Jon Kwang-ik.
 3 October - Pak Nam-chol.
 10 December - Pak Chol-min.

References

 
North Korea
1980s in North Korea
Years of the 20th century in North Korea
North Korea